The Gorkhaland movement is a campaign to create a separate state of India in the Gorkhaland region of West Bengal for the Nepali speaking Indians. The proposed state includes the hill regions of the Darjeeling district, Kalimpong district and Dooars regions that include Jalpaiguri, Alipurduar and parts of Cooch behar districts. A demand for a separate administrative unit in Darjeeling has existed since 1909, when the Hillmen's Association of Darjeeling submitted a memorandum to Minto-Morley Reforms demanding a separate administrative setup.

The proposed Gorkhaland will have an area of over 7,500 sq km and it would be bigger than the Indian states of Goa and Sikkim. Its population is four million roughly equal to the population of Manipur and Tripura. However the proposed state doesn't have a Gorkha majority. Gorkhas constitute only around 35 per cent of the total population in the proposed state (In the Darjeeling district, Nepali is spoken by 40% of the population, While in the Kalimpong district, It is spoken by 51% of the population. Around 15-20 % in the Dooars and Terai regions) have stated Nepali as their mother tongue. The rest of the population would be Rajbongshis (25%), Adivasis (20%), Bengalis (15%) and around 5% others (Totos, Mechs and Biharis)

History

In the 1980s, Subhash Ghisingh raised the demand for the creation of a state called Gorkhaland within India to be carved out of the hills of Darjeeling and areas of Dooars and Siliguri terai contiguous to Darjeeling. The Gorkhas have been demanding for separation from West Bengal since 1907 on the grounds that they are culturally, ethnically different from West Bengal. The demand took a violent turn, which led to the death of over 1,200 people. This movement culminated with the formation of Darjeeling Gorkha Hill Council (DGHC) in 1988. The DGHC administered the Darjeeling hills for 23 years with some degree of autonomy.
 
A new violent movement for a separate state of Gorkhaland was started in 1986 by Gorkha National Liberation Front (GNLF) led by Subhash Ghisingh. The agitation ultimately led to the establishment of a semiautonomous body in 1988 called the Darjeeling Gorkha Hill Council (DGHC) to govern certain areas of Darjeeling district. However, in 2007, a new party called the Gorkha Janmukti Morcha (GJM) raised the demand for a separate state of Gorkhaland once again.

The fourth DGHC elections were due in 2004. However, the government decided not to hold elections and instead made Subhash Ghisingh the sole caretaker of the DGHC till a new Sixth Schedule tribal council was established. Resentment among the former councillors of DGHC grew rapidly. Among them, Bimal Gurung, once the trusted aide of Ghising, decided to break away from the GNLF. Riding on a mass support for Prashant Tamang, an Indian Idol contestant from Darjeeling, Bimal quickly capitalized on the public support he received for supporting Prashant, and was able to overthrow Ghisingh from the seat of power. He went on to found the Gorkha Janmukti Morcha raising the demand a state of Gorkhaland.

The demand for Gorkhaland took a new turn with the assassination of Madan Tamang, leader of Akhil Bharatiya Gorkha League. He was stabbed to death allegedly by Gorkha Janmukti Morcha supporters on 21 May 2010, in Darjeeling, which led to a spontaneous shutdown in the three Darjeeling hill sub-divisions of Darjeeling, Kalimpong and Kurseong. After the murder of Madan Tamang, the West Bengal government threatened action against Gorkha Janmukti Morcha, whose senior leaders are named in the FIR, meanwhile hinting discontinuation of ongoing talks over interim arrangement with the Gorkha party, saying it had "lost popular support following the assassination".

On 8 February 2011, three GJM activists were shot dead (one of whom succumbed to her injuries later) by the police as they tried to enter Jalpaiguri district on a padyatra led by Bimal Gurung from Gorubathan to Jaigaon. This led to violence in the Darjeeling hills and an indefinite strike was called by GJM that lasted 9 days.

In the 2011 West Bengal state assembly election held on 18 April 2011, GJM candidates won three Darjeeling hill assembly seats, proving that the demand for Gorkhaland was still strong in Darjeeling. GJM candidates Trilok Dewan won from Darjeeling constituency Harka Bahadur Chhetri from Kalimpong constituency, and Rohit Sharma from Kurseong constituency. Wilson Champramari, an independent candidate supported by GJM, also won from Kalchini constituency in the Dooars.

2013 agitation

On 30 July 2013, the Congress Working Committee unanimously passed a resolution to recommend the formation of a separate Telangana state from Andhra Pradesh to the INC-led central government. This resulted in flaring up of demands throughout India, prominent among them were the demands for statehood for Gorkhaland in West Bengal and Bodoland in Assam.

Following a 3 days bandh, GJM announced an indefinite bandh from 3 August. Largely peaceful, political development took place in the background. With the West Bengal government armed with Calcutta high court order declaring the bandh as illegal, the government toughened its stand by sending a total of 10 companies of paramilitary force to quell any violent protest and arresting prominent GJM leaders and workers. In response GJM announced a unique form of protest 'Janta Bandh', in which with no picketing or the use of force, the people in the hills were asked to voluntarily stay inside on 13 and 14 August. This proved to be a major success and an embarrassment for the government.

After a marathon 'all party meeting' convened by the Gorkha Janamukti Morcha (GJM) on 16 August at Darjeeling, the pro Gorkhaland parties informally formed 'Gorkhaland Joint Action Committee'.

2017 agitation

Between June and September 2017, there was another agitation in Darjeeling. Protests first started after the West Bengal government announced on 16 May that Bengali language should be a compulsory subject in all schools across the state. This was interpreted as an imposition of an alien culture by the Gorkha Janamukti Morcha (GJM) administered area where the majority of the people speak Nepali.

There were a few clashes between the police and the agitators initially. Strikes were called on a few occasions. The situation worsened on 15 June, when the police raided a GJM office and seized spade, sickle, bow, arrow, hoe, and shovel. This was followed by violent clashes between the police and the agitators. And following this, the GJM called an indefinite strike and shut down in the region.

There were widespread instances of violence including riots, arson, torching of vehicles, government properties and houses. In one of these protests, the Darjeeling Himalayan Railway was torched by the protesters. Mass rallies were taken out regularly by the supporters of the Gorkhaland agitation. There have been multiple injuries of both the Gorkhaland supporters and security personnel. A total of 11 people have died in the protests till date. The internet services of the region were also suspended by the government for the duration of the shutdown. There were complaints of the violation of human right in the region, and an APDR (Association for the Protection of Democratic Rights) team was sent to the region to investigate the issue.

On 9 July, the protests reach New Delhi. Supporters staged a march from Raj Ghat to Jantar Mantar. This was followed by the GJM rejecting the State Government’s offer of talks. On 29 August, the state Government called a meeting with the hill parties. But the meeting was fruitless and they could not arrive at a conclusion. This was followed by another round of talks where there was a consensus to end the shutdown. The supporters met the Home Minister on 19 September. This was followed by the hills slowly returning to normalcy. On 26 September, internet services were restored in the region. Then on 27 September, GJM headed by new chairperson Binay Tamang finally called off the strike after 104 days.

Even after the strike was called off, there were a few stray incidents of violence and protests in the region. But the region as a whole was much calmer than before. And so on 27 October, the Supreme Court directed the Centre to withdraw 7 of the 15 central armed forces deployed in the region.

Bimal Gurung has been in hiding since then for fear of being arrested under the Unlawful Activities (Prevention) Act.

Gorkhaland Territorial Administration 

The memorandum of agreement for the formation of a Gorkhaland Territorial Administration (GTA), a semi-autonomous administrative body for the Darjeeling hills, was signed on 18 July 2011. Earlier, during the West Bengal assembly election (2011) campaign, Mamata Banerjee had said that Darjeeling is an integrated part of Bengal. While Mamata implied that this would be the end of the Gorkhaland movement, Bimal Gurung reiterated that this was just another step towards statehood. Both spoke publicly at the same venue in Pintail Village near Siliguri, where the tripartite agreement was signed. A bill for the creation of GTA was passed in the West Bengal Legislative Assembly on 2 September 2011. The West Bengal government issued a gazette notification for the GTA Act on 14 March 2012, signalling preparations for elections for the GTA. In the elections of the GTA held on 29 July 2012, GJM candidates won from 17 constituencies and the rest 28 seats unopposed. After an agitation of about two years, the GJM also agreed to the setting up of another autonomous body, called  Gorkhaland Territorial Administration. Gurung is currently the chief executive of the GTA.
However, over the last few months, the GJM has expressed severe dissatisfaction over the functioning of the GTA and have revived the call for the separate state of Gorkhaland.

On 30 July 2013, Gurung resigned from the GTA citing both interference from the West Bengal government and the renewed agitation for Gorkhaland.

Regional political parties in Gorkhaland 
 Gorkha Janmukti Morcha (GJM)
 Gorkha National Liberation Front (GNLF)
 Bharatiya Gorkha Prajatantrik Morcha (BGPM) 
 Hamro Party (HP)
 Gorkha Rashtriya Congress (GRC)
 Akhil Bharatiya Gorkha League (ABGL)
 Communist Party of Revolutionary Marxists (CPRM)
 Jana Andolan Party (JAP)

See also 
 Kamtapur Liberation Organisation 
 Bodoland Territorial Region
 Gurkha
 Indian Gorkha 
 Nepalese people
 Gorkha Kingdom
 Gurkha War

References

Sources

External links 

Politics of West Bengal
Politics of Sikkim
Politics of Darjeeling district
Proposed states and union territories of India